The following is the songwriting and production discography of Kara DioGuardi.

Songs written

TBA

Ali Lohan - Ali Lohan's forthcoming studio album
 00. "All the Way Around"
 00. "Close That Door"
Nicole Scherzinger - Her Name Is Nicole shelved project
 10. "Who's Gonna Love You"

As producer/co-producer
Britney Spears ("Heaven on Earth", "Ooh Ooh Baby")
Celine Dion ("Surprise Surprise", "One Heart")
Cobra Starship ("Good Girls Go Bad" (featuring Leighton Meester)
Kelly Clarkson ("Walk Away")
Santana ("Feeling You")
Lindsay Lohan ("Over", "First", "Confessions of a Broken Heart (Daughter to Father)")
Hannah Montana (Miley Cyrus's role) ("We Got the Party")
Katharine McPhee ("Love Story", "Home")
Raven-Symoné ("Backflip", "What Is Love")
Jessica Simpson ("A Little Bit" (Chris "The Greek" and Guido Club Mix))
Kylie Minogue ("Good Like That")
Backstreet Boys ("Something That I Already Know")
Hilary Duff ("Little Voice")
Genta Ismajli ("Planet Me")

As performer
Featured artist
Kelly Clarkson ("The Sun Will Rise") (Deluxe edition bonus track')
Stronger (2011)

References

Discographies of American artists
Pop music discographies
Production discographies